Can-Con may refer to:
 Can Con, Short for "Canadian Content", a Canadian policy requiring a set percentage of Canadian works on the Canadian Airwaves
 CAN-CON (convention), Ottawa Literary science fiction convention
 Cancon, a commune in Nouvelle-Aquitaine, France